Solve is Dream's eighth single.  The single reached #17 on the weekly Oricon charts and charted for three weeks.  The title track was the May 2001 ending theme for Nihon TV show Pinpapa and the image song for the Japanese release of Little Nicky.

Track list
 "Solve" (Original mix)
 "Solve" (Beatwave Anthem Mix)
 "Solve" (Dub's Floor Mix Pop Tune 002)
 "Solve" (Conmo remix 4.17)
 "Solve" (Instrumental)

Credits
 Mai Matsumuro (Lyrics)
 Kawamoto Morifumi (Music)
 Izumi "D・M・X" Miyazaki (Arrangement)

External links
 Oricon.co.jp

Dream (Japanese group) songs
2001 songs
Songs written by Mai Matsumuro